The Miss America 2020 competition was held on Thursday, December 19, 2019. This was the 93rd Miss America pageant/competition, though the Miss America Organization celebrated its 99th anniversary in 2019. This discrepancy is due to national pageants not being held from 1928 to 1932 or in 1934 because of financial problems associated with the Great Depression.

In May 2019, it was announced that the 2020 competition would be broadcast on NBC after previously being aired on ABC since 2011. NBC previously aired Miss America pageants for more than two decades until ABC was selected to air the Miss America 1998 pageant in September 1997. This is also the first beauty pageant to be aired by NBC since the network terminated its contract with the Miss Universe Organization in June 2015 over controversial remarks that were made by Donald Trump during his 2016 presidential campaign.

In July 2019, it was announced that the 2020 competition would be held at the Mohegan Sun in Uncasville, Connecticut on Thursday, December 19, 2019, making this the ninth edition of the competition that would not be held at Boardwalk Hall in Atlantic City, New Jersey.

Miss America 2019, Nia Franklin of New York, officially crowned Camille Schrier of Virginia as her successor at the end of the event.

Schrier's reign was originally to end in December 2020, but the reign will be extended due to outside factors, with the next pageant now scheduled for at least the end of 2021 due to the COVID-19 pandemic making it unfeasible to be held before 2020's end.

Overview

Organization of competition
The preliminary competition consisted of private interviews with judges (20% of preliminary score), on-stage interview (15%), talent competition (50%), and "social impact pitch" (15%). Candidates will not be judged in an evening gown or swimsuit competition.

The fifteen candidates from the preliminary competition with the highest overall scores were announced during the televised event. For the top 15 finalists, their preliminary scores contributed to 25% of their final night score. The top 15 was then immediately whittled down to the top 7 candidates (without any phase of competition being completed or televised).  Then the top 7 competed in on-stage "job interview"; the top 5 performed their respective talents; and the top 3 candidates presented their "social impact pitch" to the panel of judges. These phases of competition contributed to 25%, 30%, and 20% of their final night score respectively. The final two candidates then were asked the same question (alternating answering first) and given the chance to agree or give rebuttal to the other candidate's answer. From this, the judges then determined the placements of the finalists.

Judges

Preliminary judges
On December 15–16, 2019, judges for the preliminary competition selected winners of the preliminary competitions as well as the top finalists for the final night of competition. The panel included composer and music producer, Anthony Barfield; model and lifestyle consultant, Holly Pelham Davis; and executive director for the Clinton Foundation, Stephanie S. Streett.

Final night judges
The panel of judges on the final night of competition on December 19, 2019, included actress, Lauren Ash; TV host, Karamo Brown; and singer, songwriter, and actress, Kelly Rowland.

Results

Placements

Order of announcements

Top 15

Top 7

Top 5

Top 3

Top 2

Awards

Preliminary awards

Equity and Justice Scholarship awards 
In September 2019, the Miss America Organization announced that a new scholarship, the Equity and Justice Scholarship,  will be awarded at the 2020 competition to the candidate, "who best exemplifies inclusion and acceptance of these principles in her social impact initiative."

Social Impact Initiative Scholarship awards 
Formerly called “Quality of Life Award”

STEM Scholarship awards

Women in Business Scholarship awards

Other awards

Candidates
The Miss America 2020 candidates were:

Notes

References

2020
2019 beauty pageants
December 2019 events in the United States
2019 in Connecticut